Ashley Henley (May 17, 1981 – June 13, 2021) was an American teacher and politician from Southaven, Mississippi, who served in the Mississippi House of Representatives from the 40th district from 2016 to 2020. She was a member of the Republican Party.

Early life and career
Henley taught in the DeSoto County School District for 13 years. She was also an adjunct instructor in American history at Northwest Mississippi Community College.

Political career
Henley first ran as a Republican for the Mississippi House of Representatives in the 40th district in the 2015 Republican primary against Pat Nelson, the incumbent. She was one of several challengers to incumbent legislators not supporting private voucher schools who defeated the incumbents with financial assistance from the political action committee of Empower Mississippi.

In 2019, Henley lost her re-election bid to Hester Jackson-McCray, a member of the Democratic Party, by 14 votes. Henley brought suit in state court to overturn the election results. Henley sought a do-over election, but the Mississippi House declined her request, seating Jackson-McCray.

After leaving the state house, Henley worked for the Mississippi Center for Public Policy as a legislative fellow.

Personal life
Henley was married to Brandon Henley. They had a son together.

Death
On June 13, 2021, Henley was shot and killed in Water Valley, Mississippi, close to a trailer where her sister-in-law's burned body was found in December 2020. The sister-in-law's death was reported to be the result of a trailer fire. Though the investigation is ongoing, investigators said since Henley's shooting they are looking at the sister-in-law's death "with fresh eyes". Henley and her husband had previously said that investigators concluded Henley's sister-in-law Kristina Michelle Jones died in an arson, but the couple said Jones was murdered as there was no smoke in Jones's lungs at autopsy, indicating that Jones must have died prior to the fire. The couple also said that law enforcement in Yalobusha County was refusing to do anything substantial about it.

References

External links

1981 births
2021 deaths
Deaths by firearm in Mississippi
Republican Party members of the Mississippi House of Representatives
Place of birth missing
Women state legislators in Mississippi
American murder victims
Educators from Mississippi
21st-century American educators
21st-century American women educators
21st-century American politicians
21st-century American women politicians
People murdered in Mississippi
People from Southaven, Mississippi
Northwest Mississippi Community College alumni
University of Mississippi alumni
History of women in Mississippi